Lola Yberri was a Mexican dancer who performed in theatres in cities such as London and San Francisco in the early 20th century.  While in New York, she took lessons from the ballet dancer, Marie Bonfanti.  In 1905, she appeared in Kinetoscope moving pictures directed by Alfred Clark – Cyclone Dance and Fan Dance.

References

Mexican female dancers
Year of birth missing
Year of death missing
20th-century Mexican people